Molla Kola (also Romanized as Mollā Kolā and Mollā Kalā) is a village in Kiakola Rural District, in the Central District of Simorgh County, Mazandaran Province, Iran. At the 2006 census, its population was 829, in 206 families.

References 

Populated places in Simorgh County